is a Japanese tennis player.

On 24 February 2020, Muramatsu achieved a career-high singles ranking of world No. 205. On 2 April 2018, she peaked at No. 303 in the WTA doubles rankings. Muramatsu has won one singles title and three doubles titles on the ITF Circuit.

She made her WTA Tour main-draw debut at the 2018 Japan Open, after receiving a wildcard for the women's doubles tournament, partnering Hiroko Kuwata.

At the 2019 Kunming Open, as a part of the ITF Circuit, Muramatsu made one of her biggest victory defeating top 100 Zhu Lin in the second round.

Grand Slam singles performance timelines

ITF Circuit finals

Singles: 3 (1 title, 2 runner–ups)

Doubles: 10 (3 titles, 7 runner–ups)

Notes

References

External links
 
 

1998 births
Living people
Japanese female tennis players
Sportspeople from Yamanashi Prefecture
Sportspeople from Chiba Prefecture
21st-century Japanese women